Goerke Field is a stadium in Stevens Point, Wisconsin. It is primarily used for American football and is the home to the University of Wisconsin–Stevens Point Pointers and the Stevens Point Area Senior High School Panthers. The stadium was outfitted with artificial turf in 2008 due to the poor condition of the grass field it replaced.

References

College football venues
Wisconsin–Stevens Point Pointers football
American football venues in Wisconsin